Gunzenhausen station is apart from Cronheim station on the Nördlingen–Gunzenhausen railway, now operated as a heritage railway,  the only station in the Bavarian town of Gunzenhausen and a hub of Middle Franconia. It is classified by Deutsche Bahn as a category 4 station. and has five platform tracks. The station is served by about 60 trains daily operated by Deutsche Bahn, and is served by the Treuchtlingen–Würzburg railway. The Gunzenhausen–Pleinfeld railway (also known as the Seenlandbahn or "Lakeland railway") and the Nördlingen–Gunzenhausen line, which is served by steam-hauled services on some days, also begin in Gunzenhausen.

Location

The station is located to the north of the centre of Gunzenhausen. The station building is located on the station forecourt (Bahnhofplatz) at the ends of Bahnhofstraße and Schillerstraße. Ansbacher Straße passes under the tracks to the west of the station. Alemannenstraße is to the north of the tracks. The station has the address of Bahnhofplatz 3.

History

Gunzenhausen station was opened on 20 August 1849 in conjunction with the Oettingen–Gunzenhausen section of the Ludwig South-North Railway. The line's extension to Schwabach and put into operation on 1 October 1849 and the entire Ludwig South-North Railway from Hof via Bamberg, Nuremberg, Nördlingen, Augsburg and Kempten to Lindau in operation on 1 March 1854. The route ran via Nördlingen and Gunzenhausen as a direct route through the Franconian Alb was uneconomical at the time because of the necessary gradients. On 1 July 1859 the line to Ansbach was opened to connect the city to the Ludwig South-North Railway. This line was extended to Würzburg on 1 July 1864 and this was followed by the extension from Gunzenhausen to Treuchtlingen on 2 October 1869. On 1 October 1906, a new section of the Nuremberg–Augsburg railway was opened, which ran directly to Treuchtlingen, making the detour via Nördlingen and the Franconian Jura unnecessary. As a result, the Ludwig South-North Railway and Gunzenhausen station lost importance.

Deutsche Bundesbahn closed passenger services on the Nördlingen–Gunzenhausen line on 29 September 1985 and freight operations on 1 August 1995. Since 8 June 2003, the line has been operated by the Bavarian Railway Museum (Bayerische Eisenbahnmuseum). In addition to regular freight traffic, the Schwarzkopf factory in Wassertrüdingen is served.

Infrastructure 

The station has five tracks next to three platforms, all of which are covered. The two island platforms are connected by a pedestrian underpass to the “home” platform (platform 1, next to the station building). There are no digital destination displays and the station is not accessible by wheelchairs. Track 1 is used by Regionalbahn trains to Pleinfeld. Track 3 is used by regional services to Würzburg and track 4 is used by regional services towards Treuchtlingen. Track 5 is used by heritage trains to Nördlingen and on working days freight trains to Wassertrüdingen while track 2 is only used by the daily freight train from the factory in Wassertrüdingen which brings freight wagons to the railway sidings in Gunzenhausen. The station building has a ticket office, which is no longer staffed, and shops.

Platform data

Platform lengths and heights are as follows:

Track 1: length 178 m, height 22 cm
Track 2: length 152 m, height 38 cm
Track 3: length 360 m, height 38 cm
Track 4: length 356 m, height 38 cm
Track 5: length 195 m, height 38 cm

Services

Gunzenhausen station is served hourly by the Würzburg–Treuchtlingen Regionalbahn service, operated with class 440 EMUs as the Mainfrankenbahn. Also individual Intercity services operate on line IC 26. A pair of services operating daily as the Königssee runs from Hamburg-Altona to Berchtesgaden and Oberstdorf, dividing in Augsburg. On Saturdays and Sundays the Intercity Grossglockner service runs between Schwarzach-Sankt Veit or Munich and Flensburg, which only stop in Gunzenhausen when running towards Flensburg. On Fridays and Sundays another pair of trains runs between Munich and Hamburg-Altona. Regionalbahn services run hourly on the Gunzenhausen–Pleinfeld line between Gunzenhausen and Pleinfeld, operated with a class 642 diesel railcar. On some weekends steam hauled trains also run between Nördlingen and Gunzenhausen.

References

Sources 

 
 
 

Railway stations in Bavaria
Railway stations in Germany opened in 1849
1849 establishments in Bavaria
Buildings and structures in Weißenburg-Gunzenhausen